Silver Bow County is a county in the U.S. state of Montana. As of the 2020 census, the population was 35,133. Its county seat is Butte. In 1977, the city and county governments consolidated to form the single entity of Butte-Silver Bow. Additionally, the town of Walkerville is a separate municipality from Butte and is within the county.

Silver Bow County comprises the Butte-Silver Bow, MT Micropolitan Statistical Area.

Geography
It is Montana's smallest county by area.

Major highways

  Interstate 15
  Interstate 90
  Interstate 115
  U.S. Highway 10 (Former)
  U.S. Highway 91
  Montana Highway 2
  Montana Highway 41
  Montana Highway 43
  Montana Highway 55

Adjacent counties
 Deer Lodge County - northwest
 Jefferson County - east
 Madison County - south
 Beaverhead County - southwest

National protected areas
Beaverhead–Deerlodge National Forest (part)

Demographics

2000 census
As of the 2000 United States census, there were 34,606 people, 14,432 households, and 8,933 families living in the county. The population density was 48 people per square mile (19/km2). There were 16,176 housing units at an average density of 22 per square mile (9/km2). The racial makeup of the county was 95.35% White, 0.16% Black or African American, 2.03% Native American, 0.43% Asian, 0.06% Pacific Islander, 0.59% from other races, and 1.37% from two or more races. 2.75% of the population were Hispanic or Latino of any race. 25.4% were of Irish, 14.2% German, 11.4% English and 5.9% Italian ancestry.

There were 14,432 households, out of which 28.00% had children under the age of 18 living with them, 47.80% were married couples living together, 10.50% had a female householder with no husband present, and 38.10% were non-families. 32.80% of all households were made up of individuals, and 13.70% had someone living alone who was 65 years of age or older. The average household size was 2.32 and the average family size was 2.97.

The county population contained 23.70% under the age of 18, 9.60% from 18 to 24, 26.70% from 25 to 44, 24.00% from 45 to 64, and 16.00% who were 65 years of age or older. The median age was 39 years. For every 100 females there were 97.80 males. For every 100 females age 18 and over, there were 96.30 males.

The median income for a household in the county was $30,402, and the median income for a family was $40,018. Males had a median income of $31,295 versus $21,610 for females. The per capita income for the county was $17,009. About 10.70% of families and 14.90% of the population were below the poverty line, including 19.20% of those under age 18 and 8.90% of those age 65 or over.

2010 census
As of the 2010 United States census, there were 34,200 people, 14,932 households, and 8,651 families living in the county. The racial makeup of the county was 94.4% white, 1.9% American Indian, 0.5% Asian, 0.3% black or African American, 0.1% Pacific islander, 0.7% from other races, and 2.1% from two or more races. Those of Hispanic or Latino origin made up 3.7% of the population. In terms of ancestry, 32.6% were Irish, 23.3% were German, 16.1% were English, 8.3% were Italian, 6.9% were Norwegian, and 3.2% were American.

Of the 14,932 households, 26.0% had children under the age of 18 living with them, 42.2% were married couples living together, 10.6% had a female householder with no husband present, 42.1% were non-families, and 35.1% of all households were made up of individuals. The average household size was 2.22 and the average family size was 2.87. The median age was 41.3 years.

The median income for a household in the county was $37,986 and the median income for a family was $52,288. Males had a median income of $41,491 versus $28,132 for females. The per capita income for the county was $21,357. About 11.6% of families and 17.8% of the population were below the poverty line, including 23.1% of those under age 18 and 8.9% of those age 65 or over.

Government and politics
As with neighboring Deer Lodge County are the two most consistently Democratic counties in Montana when it comes to Presidential elections, with Silver Bow County last voting Republican in 1956 for Dwight D. Eisenhower.

Over the last century, Silver Bow County has voted only once for a Republican gubernatorial candidate (Marc Racicot during the 1996 Montana election). Silver Bow County has not supported any Republican at all for the U.S. Senate since at least 1928.

Silver Bow County is in Senate District 37 and in HR District 73.

Communities

City
 Butte (county seat)

Town
 Walkerville

Unincorporated communities

 Divide
 High View
 Melrose
 Ramsay
 Rocker
 Silver Bow
 Williamsburg

See also
 List of lakes in Silver Bow County, Montana
 List of mountains in Silver Bow County, Montana
 National Register of Historic Places listings in Silver Bow County, Montana

References

External links

 Official website

 
1881 establishments in Montana Territory
Populated places established in 1881